Hiram Page ( 1800August 12, 1852) was an early member of the Latter Day Saint movement and one of the Eight Witnesses to the Book of Mormon's golden plates.

Early life
Page was born in Vermont. Earlier in his life, he studied medicine which he practiced during his travels throughout New York and Canada. On November 10, 1825, Page married Catherine Whitmer, daughter of Peter Whitmer Sr. and Mary Musselman. The two had nine children together: John, Elizabeth, Philander, Mary, Peter, Nancy, Hiram, Oliver, and Kate.

Early involvement in the Latter Day Saint movement
Page became one of the Eight Witnesses during June 1829.

He and Catherine were baptized into in the Church of Christ (later renamed the Church of Jesus Christ of Latter Day Saints) on April 11, 1830, by Oliver Cowdery. On June 9, he was ordained a teacher in the church, one of the church's first twelve officers.

Seer stone and revelations
Page was living with his in-laws the Whitmers in Fayette, New York. Smith arrived in August 1830 to discover Page using a black "seerstone" to produce revelations for the church. The revelations were regarding the organization and location of Zion. Cowdery and the Whitmer family believed the revelations were authentic. In response, Smith announced in a new revelation during the church's September conference that Page's revelations were of the devil (Doctrine and Covenants). At the conference there was considerable discussion on the topic. Page agreed to discard the stone and the revelations and join in following Smith as the sole revelator for the church. The members present confirmed this unanimously with a vote. The fate of the stone and revelations was not recorded by contemporary sources and has been the subject of interest ever since.  Martin Harris's brother Emer stated second-hand in 1856 that the stone was ground to powder and the associated revelations were burned. Apostle Alvin R. Dyer stated that he had discovered Page's seerstone in 1955, that it had been passed down through Jacob Whitmer's family. The validity of this claim has been questioned.

Migration to Ohio and Missouri
In January 1831, Page accompanied Lucy Mack Smith and a company of saints from Waterloo, New York, to Buffalo on the Erie Canal, on their way to Fairport and Kirtland, Ohio. In May 1831, Page moved his family to Thompson, Ohio, under Lucy Mack Smith's direction. He again moved his family to Jackson County, Missouri, in 1832 and joined the Latter Day Saints gathering there. With the other Whitmers, they formed a cluster of ten or twelve homes called the "Whitmer Settlement". Hiram owned  of land in the area.

During the growing anti-Mormon hostilities in  Jackson County, Page was severely beaten by a group of non-Mormon vigilantes on October 31, 1833. On July 31 and August 6, 1834, he testified to the facts of the beatings. By 1834, Page and his family were expelled from the county along with the other Latter Day Saints, and lived for a time in neighboring Clay County, before moving to Far West.

Schism with Joseph Smith and later life
When the members of the Whitmer family were excommunicated from the church in 1838, Page withdrew from church fellowship. He later bought a farm in Excelsior Springs, in Ray County.

On September 6, 1847, William E. McLellin baptized Page, David Whitmer, John Whitmer, and Jacob Whitmer into his newly formed Church of Christ (Whitmerite). McLellin ordained Page a high priest in the church. Page participated in the subsequent ordinations of the others.

Page died on his farm in Excelsior Springs, Missouri, still affirming his testimony of the Book of Mormon. His death was caused when his wagon overturned, crushing him underneath.

For almost 150 years, the final resting place of Page was unknown. However, in 2000, it was located near Excelsior Springs, on property purchased by Charles and Molly Fulkerson in 1917. Page's burial location was the last of the 11 Book of Mormon witnesses to be identified. A commemorative marker was placed on Page's grave on April 27, 2002.

References

General

 

1800 births
1852 deaths
19th-century American physicians
American Latter Day Saint leaders
American Latter Day Saints
Book of Mormon witnesses
Converts to Mormonism
Doctrine and Covenants people
Latter Day Saint leaders
People excommunicated by the Church of Christ (Latter Day Saints)
People from Excelsior Springs, Missouri
People from Fayette, New York
People from Vermont
Religious leaders from Vermont
Road incident deaths in Missouri
Seership in Mormonism
Whitmer family